San Giovanni Ilarione is a comune (municipality) in the Province of Verona in the Italian region Veneto, located about  west of Venice and about  northeast of Verona.

San Giovanni Ilarione borders the following municipalities: Cazzano di Tramigna, Chiampo, Montecchia di Crosara, Roncà, Tregnago, and Vestenanova.

The parish church is San Giovanni Battista.

References

External links
 Official website

Cities and towns in Veneto